Concord Sky (formerly YSL Residences) is a mixed-use skyscraper under construction in Toronto, Ontario, Canada. YSL is an acronym for "Yonge Street Living". Upon completion, the building will surpass First Canadian Place in height to become Canada's second-tallest skyscraper, after The One. If the building is completed before The One is finished, then the building will briefly become the tallest building in Canada.

History
When YSL Residences was first proposed in 2017, the plan called for the construction of a 98-storey, 343.9 m (1128 ft) tall building with a sloping south face that was pinched-in partway up. The building now features a sloping north face with inset balconies.

In 2020, the project was put on pause due to the COVID-19 pandemic. Developer Cresford Development went into receivership and construction has not resumed. The existing building on site was removed except for its facade, which is to be preserved, leaving a pit and construction office on site.

In 2021, the project was sold to Canadian developer Concord Adex and rebranded as Concord Sky. Units began presale the same year, with construction to resume in the near future.

See also
List of tallest buildings in Canada
List of tallest buildings in Ontario
List of tallest buildings in Toronto

References

External links
 

Skyscrapers in Toronto
Buildings and structures under construction in Canada